Krišovská Liesková or Mokcsamogyorós is a village and municipality in Michalovce District in the Kosice Region of eastern Slovakia.

History
In historical records the village was first mentioned in 1321.
Mokcsamogyorós was formed by the unification of the villages Mokcsakerész and Ungmogyorós.

Geography
The village lies at an altitude of 112 metres and covers an area of  (2020-06-30/-07-01).

According to the census in 2011 it had 903 inhabitants of which 733 was Hungarian and 103 Slovak.

References

External links
https://web.archive.org/web/20070427022352/http://www.statistics.sk/mosmis/eng/run.html 

Villages and municipalities in Michalovce District
Villages in Slovakia merged with other villages